Fossarina is a genus of sea snails, marine gastropod molluscs in the family Trochidae, the top shells. 

The genus Fossarina was moved from the family Fossariidae to the newly created subfamily Fossarininae within the family Trochidae by Williams et al. in 2010.

Description
The shell is auriform, a little depressed and narrowly umbilicated. The spire is short. The oval aperture is oblique. The lips are rounded. The operculum is multispiral.

Distribution
This marine genus occurs off Australia,  Tasmania and New Zealand; in the East China Sea.

Species
Species within the genus Fossarina include:
 Fossarina legrandi Petterd, 1879
 Fossarina patula A. Adams & Angas, 1863
 Fossarina petterdi Crosse, 1870
 Fossarina picta A. Adams, 1867
 Fossarina reedi (Verco, 1907)
 Fossarina rimata (Hutton, 1884)
The Indo-Pacific Molluscan Database also mentions the following species:
 Fossarina mariei (P. Fischer, 1890)
 Fossarina variegata (A. Adams, 1855)
Species brought into synonymy
 Fossarina brazieri Angas, 1871: synonym of Fossarina patula A. Adams & Angas, 1863
 Fossarina funiculata Tenison-Woods, 1880: synonym of Fossarina patula A. Adams & Angas, 1863
 Fossarina hoffmeisteri Ladd, 1966: synonym of Calliotrochus marmoreus (Pease, 1861)
 Fossarina mutabilis May W.L., 1909: synonym of Risellopsis mutabilis May, 1909
 Fossarina reedi (Verco, 1907): synonym of Minopa reedi (Verco, 1907)
 Fossarina simpsoni Tenison-Woods, 1876: synonym of Fossarina petterdi Crosse, 1870

References

 OBIS
 Suter, H., 1913. Manual of the New Zealand Mollusca. Government Printer, Wellington. xxii 1210 p.
 Cotton, B.C., 1959. South Australian Mollusca. Archaeogastropoda. South Australian Government Printer, Adelaide. 1-449
 Iredale, T. & McMichael, D.F., 1962 [31/Dec/1962]. A reference list of the marine Mollusca of New South Wales. Mem. Aust. Mus., 11:0-0.
 Ladd, H.S., 1966 [31/Dec/1966].Chitons and gastropods (Haliotidae through Adeorbidae) from the western Pacific Islands. United States Geological Survey, Professional Pape, 531:0-0.

 
Trochidae
Gastropod genera